, also known as , was the most influential of a number of scholar-monks of the Buddhist Tendai sect active during the tenth and eleventh centuries in Japan. In spite of growing political tensions within the Tendai religious hierarchy, and despite being one of the two leading disciples of the controversial Ryogen, 18th head of the Enryakuji Temple, Genshin and a small group of fellow monks maintained a secluded community at Yokawa on Mount Hiei solely devoted toward rebirth in the Pure Land, while staying largely neutral in the conflict. He was one of the thinkers who maintained that the nembutsu ritual, which was said to induce a vision of Amida, was an important hermeneutic principle in the Buddhist doctrinal system. 

In summarizing Genshin's teachings, he emphasized the efficacy of the nembutsu for rebirth in the Pure Land, but as part of a holistic approach using a number of mutually supportive practices such as visualization, chanting, personal conduct, etc., in contrast to the later, exclusive teaching of Honen.  The purpose and intent of the Pure Land remained in Genshin's thought, within the larger Tendai approach, with the Lotus Sutra as its central teaching, an expedient means on the path to Buddhahood.  Further, Genshin's teachings on the "deathbed nembutsu" ritual were highly influential in Heian Period Buddhist practice.

Biography 

Genshin's life is somewhat obscure despite four different biographies written about him in the Heian Period, but what is known is that Genshin was born in Yamato Province to one Uraba no Masachika and his wife from the Kiyohara clan.  His pious mother is said to have wished for a son, and prayed before a statue of the bodhisattva Kannon.  After receiving a vision where a monk handed her a jewel, she is said to have become pregnant and gave birth to Genshin.

Genshin took tonsure with the Tendai sect of Buddhism as a child at Enryakuji Temple, though the reasons are unknown.  One theory is that his father died, since his mother and sisters also took tonsure at some point. While there, he studied under the controversial monk Ryōgen, who was active in strengthening his faction while intermingling with important political figures.  Genshin, like many novice monks at Enryakuji was trained in the Tendai tradition, which included study of other traditions, both exoteric and esoteric.  Later, Genshin took part in debates promoted by Ryōgen to enforce academic standards, and during one debate in 974 at the Imperial palace impressed one Taira no Chikanobu who wrote praise in his personal diary at Genshin's debate skills.  From this time, Genshin also wrote a number of works on Buddhist logic, some of which were personal notes, others were meant for wider audiences.

As the tension and violence between the two factions of the Tendai sect worsened, in large part due to Ryōgen's policies overtly favoring one over the other, Genshin retired to more remote Yokawa region of Mount Hiei by 981, and evidence shows increasing interest in Pure Land Buddhist teachings than before.  Other disciples of Ryōgen such as Zōga (増賀, 917-1003) similarly retired in disgust with some leaving Mount Hiei entirely.  It was at Yokawa that Genshin completed the Ōjōyōshū in 985, but not before completing other, smaller works on meditation methods of Amitabha Buddha.

According to the records from the time, the stated goal of the Fellowship was for its members to mutually assist one another in their efforts to be reborn in the Pure Land of Amitabha Buddha and away from the turbulent of the declining age of the Dharma they believed they were living in. It is unclear if Genshin was a founding member or not, however. Genshin was both active in research and writing at this time, until around 1001 when he began participating in ceremonies at the Imperial court again. In 986, Genshin did journey on a pilgrimage to Kyushu where he came into contact with Chinese Buddhist monks (and merchant escorts) who were staying there, and they exchanged works with one another. A merchant named Yang Renzhao (楊仁昭) reported that a copy of Ōjōyōshū was deposited there at Guoqingsi Temple on Mount Tiantai some time before 990. Genshin sought to further expand contacts with the parent Tiantai community in China, but due to the An Lushan Rebellion and internal strife within the Chinese community from 1000 onward, these efforts did not achieve the expected results.

By this point Genshin's fame in the Imperial court at Kyoto spread, and he was invited for lectures, events, a promotion by the court to "supernumerary minor bishop", and so on.  The powerful Fujiwara no Michinaga sought him out for private religious services, but Genshin politely refused.  The Tales of Genji also mentions a "bishop of Yokawa", which is thought to refer to Genshin.

In his final years, Genshin took up more writing, before he finally passed away in 1017 due to advanced age and probable illness.  In his final days, he lay mostly bedridden, grasping a string tied to the hand of a statue of Amitabha Buddha per his own "deathbed nembutsu" practice.  He recited verses with his disciples, and eventually died in his sleep.

Teachings 
Genshin was trained in the Tendai Buddhist tradition and his writings on the Pure Land, Buddhist logic and Tendai teachings reflected an orthodox stance:
 Emphasis on meditation, including various meditation practices on Amitabha Buddha, some promulgated by the founder Zhiyi and others elucidated in the Contemplation Sutra.
 The Three Marks of Existence: empty, arising through external conditions, provisional.
 Supremacy of the Lotus Sutra.
 All practices leading to Buddhahood, including both exoteric and esoteric.
Genshin, like many Buddhist monks at the time in Japan starting with the evangelist Kūya and the scholar-monk Senkan, took an increasing interest in Pure Land teachings imported from China.  The prevailing belief was that the world had entered the degenerate age of the Dharma, and that the only hope for salvation lay in the reliance on the power of Amitabha.  Because of this interest, and due to the worsening crisis within the Tendai monastic community, Genshin retreated from secular matters, and composed a number of treatises on Pure Land teachings, cataloging them, providing commentaries, etc.  Genshin composed over 30 different documents in his lifetime.  The , his largest work, is essentially a comprehensive analysis of the Pure Land path and existing practices.  Genshin's interpretation of the nembutsu was a fairly orthodox interpretation at the time, relying upon visualization of Amitabha Buddha's features, and on the Pure Land.  Elsewhere, Genshin acknowledged that if visualization of the Buddha was too difficult, then the nembutsu as a vocal recitation was an adequate substitute.  In addition, Genshin recommended auxiliary practices such as reciting sutras, maintaining wholesome conduct and repentance of past transgressions, all mainstream Mahayana Buddhist practices.  However, Genshin felt these practices were helpful in supporting the visualization of Amitabha Buddha, and thus he advocated a holistic approach.

Deathbed Nembutsu 

In addition to general practices related to the Pure Land, Genshin emphasized the practice of "deathbed nembutsu" that is to say the practices performed on one's deathbed.  Genshin felt that nembutsu practices performed near the hour of death were particularly important, as one's final thoughts before death had a disproportionate importance in determining one's rebirth.  While the precedence existed in earlier Chinese texts, Genshin spent considerable time in the Ōjōyōshū discussing its importance, and how to concentrate on the Buddha, and enlisting support from friends to maintain concentration and practice.  By maintaining focus until the last breath, Genshin felt that the practitioner would be assured of rebirth in the Pure Land, but if their mind wavered, rebirth was not certain.

Legacy 

Genshin's influence in contemporary Japanese culture today is primarily due to his treatise, Ōjōyōshū, particularly its graphic descriptions of the Buddhist hell realms (地獄 jigoku), which inspired a genre of horror and morality stories.  The 1960 Japanese film Jigoku was influenced by Genshin's Ōjōyōshū among other works.  In Jodo Shinshu Buddhism, he is considered the Sixth Patriarch.

Genshin is credited as the founder of the Enshin school of Tendai Buddhism, and for espousing the "original enlightenment" teaching, or hongaku (本覚), where one is originally enlightened, but unaware of it.  In all, Genshin left more than 30 works which continue to influence Pure Land thought today.

The image of Amida Nyorai in the main building of Yasaka-ji Temple in Shikoku is said to have been made by Genshin in the Heian Period.

References

Further reading
Horton, Sarah (2004). The Influence of the Ōjōyōshū in Late Tenth- and Early Eleventh-Century Japan, Japanese Journal of Religious Studies 31 (1), 29-54 
Rhodes, Robert F. (2007). Ōjōyōshū, Nihon Ōjō Gokuraku-ki, and the Construction of Pure Land Discourse in Heian Japan, Japanese Journal of Religious Studies 34 (2), 249-270
Rhodes, Robert F. (2001). Some Problems concerning Genshin's Biographies, Journal of Indian and Buddhist Studies (Indogaku Bukkyogaku Kenkyu) 50 (1), 514-511

External links 
 Profile of Eshin Sozu 
 "The Influence of Genshin's Ojoyoshu on Honen"

942 births
1017 deaths
Heian period Buddhist clergy
Jōdo Shin patriarchs